The 1963–64 season was Manchester City's 62nd season of competitive football and 15th season in the second division of English football. In addition to the Second Division, the club competed in the FA Cup and the Football League Cup.

Second Division

League table

Results summary

References

External links

Manchester City F.C. seasons
Manchester City